is a name of Japanese origin that is used both as a surname and a masculine given name. Notable people with the name include:

People with the given name
, Japanese male middle-distance runner
, Japanese samurai and diplomat

People with the surname
, Japanese professional motorcycle road racer
, Japanese professional Go player

See also
Kiyonori, a similar Japanese masculine given name

Japanese-language surnames
Japanese masculine given names